Line of Fire is a thriller novel by Donald Hamilton.

Plot summary and Evaluation
An assassination attempt carried out for a local crime boss by gun shop owner Paul Nyquist, is interrupted by a young woman.
Among Hamilton's early works, it is easily as believable as Death of a Citizen, the origin of Hamilton's Helm series. Hamilton achieves here the difficult job of offering an Action-Adventure that requires no suspension of disbelief by the reader.

Publication history
1955, USA, Dell, Dell First Edition #46, paperback
1956, UK, Allan Wingate, hardcover
1958, UK, Panther #768, paperback
1964, USA, Fawcett Publications, Gold Medal k1480, paperback, reprinted several times
1969, UK, Hodder Fawcett (publisher), Coronet Books, paperback

External links
Review by Bill Crider
Review by Bruce Grossman, Bookgasm

1955 American novels
American thriller novels
Novels by Donald Hamilton
Dell Publishing books